Maelonoceras is a Late Ordovician - early Silurian oncocerid found in Ontario.

Description 
The shell is a faintly gibbous exogastric cyrtocone with subparallel dorsal and ventral profiles but adorally converging sides. The aperture vizored, pear-shaped. The Siphuncle small, ventral.

Taxonomic relation
Maelonoceras is nautiloid cephalopod included in the Oncoceratidae along with such genera as Oncoceras, Belotoceras, Digenuoceras, and Maimoceras.

References

Walter C. Sweet, 1964. Nautiloidea-Oncocerida. Treatise on Invertebrate  Paleontology, Part K.
Maelonoceras Fossilworks entry. 
 Jack Sepkoski 2002. List of cephalopod genera

Nautiloids
Late Ordovician first appearances
Silurian extinctions